Lemyra singularis is a moth of the family Erebidae. It was described by Roepke in 1940. It is found on Java.

References

 

singularis
Moths described in 1940